The Double-Cross is an album by Tempest, released in 2006.

Tracks
"Captain Kidd" (Sorbye/Reynolds)
"Slippery Slide" (Mullen)
"Hangman" (Sorbye/Traditional)
"Black Eddy" (Sorbye/Traditional)
"Whoever You Are" (Sorbye/Reynolds)
"Vision Quest" (Cap/Wein)
"Per Spelmann" (Sorbye/Traditional)
"Cabar Feidh" (Traditional)
"Eppy Moray" (Traditional)
"Wizard's Walk" (Traditional/Ungar/Morrison)

Credits
Lief Sorbye - mandolin, vocals
Ronan Carroll - guitar
Adolfo Lazo - drums
Michael Mullen - fiddle
Ariane Cap - bass
 Robert Berry - additional keyboards
Album produced by Tempest with Robert Berry.
Vocal Production by Mike Wible and Patricia Reynolds.
Released by Magna Carta.

References

2006 albums
Tempest (band) albums